Arthur Loche  is an American former college basketball coach and was the head men's basketball coach at Vermont from 1965 to 1972.

Playing career
A letter winner and senior captain at NYU, Loche was a member of the Violets' 1959–60 Final Four squad and teammate of Naismith Hall of Fame member Satch Sanders.

Coaching career
Loche began his coaching career at his alma mater until 1965, when he accepted the head men's basketball position at Vermont. Over a seven-year period, Loche guided the Catamounts to a 69–96 record before stepping down to take the head men's basketball coach and athletic director position at Florida Institute of Technology, where he stayed until 1976.

During the college basketball off season, Loche coached the famed Vaqueros de Bayamón in Puerto Rico, leading the squad to two separate Baloncesto Superior Nacional titles in 1969 and 1971.

Head coaching record

College

References

American men's basketball coaches
College men's basketball head coaches in the United States
Florida Tech Panthers athletic directors
Florida Tech Panthers men's basketball coaches
Guards (basketball)
NYU Violets men's basketball coaches
NYU Violets men's basketball players
Vermont Catamounts men's basketball coaches
Place of birth missing (living people)
American men's basketball players